Hannah Perkins Dodge (16 February 1821 – 11 January 1896) was an American educator.

Early life
Hannah Perkins Dodge was born on a farm in Littleton, Massachusetts, on 16 February 1821, where her girlhood was spent. She was the daughter of Barnabas Dodge (1795-1873) and Sarah Corning (1800-1888). At least three of her ancestors served in the war of the revolution - one of them being captain in Col. Gerrish's regiment in service at the battle of Bunker Hill.

Dodge attended the public school and afterwards spent several terms in a select school for young ladies.

Career
When Hannah P. Dodge was seventeen years old, she began to teach a district school in a neighboring town. She next taught successfully in her own town. After teaching for some terms, Dodge went to the Lawrence Academy at Groton, Massachusetts. She completed her education in the Townsend Female Seminary, in Townsend, Massachusetts. After graduating from that school in 1844, Dodge was chosen a teacher in the institution. One year later she was chosen principal of the school, a position which she held for seven years. Dodge held the position of principal in the Oread Institute in Worcester, Massachusetts, for several years, traveled in Europe for a year and there studied modern languages and art. After her sojourn in Europe, Dodge took a desirable position in Dorchester, Boston, where she successfully managed the Codman Hill Young Ladies' School for five years. She was also on the faculty of the Ladies' Department Kalamazoo College, Michigan, and of the Colby Academy, New London, New Hampshire. Retiring from the school field in 1877, she purchased a pleasant home in Littleton, where her family had remained. In that town she was made a superintendent of schools for four years. 

Dodge was president of the local Woman's Christian Temperance Union and one of the trustees of the public library, and was active in charitable work.

She was a poet of considerable ability, a ready writer, a delightful correspondent and an artists of unusual skill. 

Uniting with the Baptist church in Littleton in 1840, Dodge loyally retained her membership with it, thereby imparting to the home church the lustre of her fame and character.

She was actively interested in the lyceum, the library, the schools, the Temperance movement and in all the work of the church and Sunday school.

Personal life
Dodge died on 11 January 1896, and is buried at Westlawn Cemetery, Littleton.

References

1821 births
1896 deaths
American educators
People from Littleton, Massachusetts
Wikipedia articles incorporating text from A Woman of the Century